Baqer Owghli (also Romanized as Bāqer Owghlī; also known as Bāqer Owghlū) is a village in Garamduz Rural District, Garamduz District, Khoda Afarin County, East Azerbaijan Province, Iran. At the 2006 census, its population was 332, in 73 families.

References 

Populated places in Khoda Afarin County